Elizabeth II was Queen of Malta as head of state of Malta from 1964 to 1974. Malta was an independent sovereign state and a constitutional monarchy, sharing a monarch with other Commonwealth realms, including the United Kingdom. Elizabeth's constitutional roles in Malta were mostly delegated to a governor-general.

In 1974, Malta became a republic and abolished the monarchy. Although Malta remained in the Commonwealth of Nations, the president of Malta replaced the queen as head of state.

History
Elizabeth II became Queen of Malta with the passage of the Malta Independence Act 1964. The Act transformed the British Crown Colony of Malta into the independent State of Malta. The Queen's executive powers were delegated to and exercised by the Governor-General of Malta.

Elizabeth II remained the head of state of Malta until the amendment of the Constitution of Malta on 13 December 1974, which abolished the monarchy and established the Republic of Malta and the office of President of Malta.

Elizabeth II officially visited the Crown Colony of Malta in 1954 (3–7 May) and the State of Malta in 1967 (14–17 November). She referenced her 1967 visit in her Christmas Broadcast that year, saying: "Today Malta is independent, with the Crown occupying the same position as it does in the other self-governing countries of which I am Queen. This is the opening of a new and challenging chapter for the people of Malta and they are entering it with determination and enthusiasm."

Prior to becoming queen she stayed on the islands four times between 1949 and 1951 to visit her husband, Prince Philip, Duke of Edinburgh, who was stationed in Malta as a serving officer in the Royal Navy.

Later visits
Elizabeth II visited Malta after it became a republic in 1992 (28–30 May), 2005 (23–26 November), and 2007 (20 November). She attended the 2015 Commonwealth Heads of Government Meeting in Malta on 26–28 November 2015.

Queen's Personal Flag for Malta 
Elizabeth II had a personal flag for use in Malta, in her role as Queen of Malta. The flag was used by the Queen when she was in Malta in 1967. The Queen's flag consisted of the Coat of arms of Malta in banner form defaced with a blue disc of the letter "E" crowned surrounded by a garland of gold roses defaces the flag, which is taken from the Queen's Personal Flag.

Styles

Elizabeth II had the following styles in her role as the monarch of Malta:

21 September 1964 – 18 January 1965:
In English: Elizabeth the Second, by the Grace of God, of the United Kingdom of Great Britain and Northern Ireland and of Her other Realms and Territories Queen, Head of the Commonwealth, Defender of the Faith
In Maltese: Eliżabetta II, Għall-Grazzja t’Alla tar-Renju Unit tal-Britannja l-Kbira u ta’ l-Irlanda ta’ Fuq u tar-Renji u t-Territorji l-Oħra Tagħha, Reġina, Kap tal-Commonwealth u Difenditriċi tal-Fidi

18 January 1965 – 13 December 1974:
In English: Elizabeth the Second, by the Grace of God, Queen of Malta and of Her other Realms and Territories, Head of the Commonwealth
In Maltese: Eliżabetta II, Għall-Grazzja t’Alla, Reġina ta’ Malta u tar-Renji u t-Territorji l-Oħra Tagħha, Kap tal-Commonwealth

Gallery

See also
Order of St Michael and St George

References

External links
Speech delivered by Elizabeth II at State banquet in Malta, 23 November 2005
Speech delivered by Elizabeth II at opening of the Commonwealth Heads of Government meeting in Malta, 25 November 2015

Government of Malta
Politics of Malta
Malta
Heads of state of Malta
1964 establishments in Malta
1974 disestablishments in Malta
Malta
Malta
Political history of Malta
Titles held only by one person